Central New York Playhouse is a community theater company in DeWitt, New York. Founded in 2012, the Playhouse performs a monthly production in ShoppingTown Mall.

References

Theatre companies in New York (state)
DeWitt, New York